Apple's Way is an American drama television series that aired on CBS from February 10, 1974, to January 12, 1975. It was created by Earl Hamner Jr.

Premise
The Apples of Los Angeles—architect George, his wife Barbara, their children Paul, Cathy, Steven, and Patricia; and Grandfather Aldon—seek refuge from the hectic pace of city living and relocate to George's hometown of Appleton, Iowa, which was founded by his ancestors.  The family had to adjust to a different culture and climate and to a slower pace of life. They lived in a working grist mill that served as a backdrop for the situations depicted in each episode. Well-meaning George would often get involved in causes that increased his family's tensions.

Apple's Way was a mid-season replacement for The New Perry Mason. The series did not gain the ratings CBS had hoped for, partly because it had to compete with NBC's long-running Top 20 hit The Wonderful World of Disney and ABC's popular crime drama The F.B.I.. The concept was "re-booted" in the second season to focus on plots that dealt more with such issues (such as freedom of speech, drug use, terminal illness) as opposed to the more rural-specific plots of the first season. The second season was produced by successful veteran producer-writer John Furia Jr. Furia hired Worley Thorne as story editor. The series was canceled during its second season and replaced with Cher.

Cast
Ronny Cox as George Apple
Frances Lee McCain as Barbara Apple
Vince Van Patten as Paul Apple (1974–1975)
Malcolm Atterbury as Grandfather Aldon
Kristy McNichol as Patricia Apple (1974–1975)
Eric Olson as Steven Apple
Patti Cohoon as Cathy Apple
Frannie Michel as Patricia Apple (1974)

Episode list

Season 1: 1974

Season 2: 1974–75

Syndication
Both TV Land and AmericanLife TV aired the series in reruns during the late 1990s and early 2000s.

Two decades after this series left the air, lead actors Ronny Cox and Frances Lee McCain were reunited in the short lived 1993–1994 television prime time soap Second Chances.

References

External links
 
 Apple's Way at The Classic TV Archive
 
 From the creator of The Waltons, Earl Hamner's Apple's Way

1970s American comedy-drama television series
1974 American television series debuts
1975 American television series endings
CBS original programming
English-language television shows
Television series by Lorimar Television
Television shows set in Iowa